Mount Taimu is a mountain in Ningde, Fujian, China. It is located 46km south of the county-level city of Fuding.

Mythology 
In Chinese mythology, the mountain was considered a gathering point for deities from the East China Sea.

Tourism 
Since 2013, it has been classified as a AAAAA scenic area by the China National Tourism Administration. The mountain and its surroundings contain scenic waterfalls, caves, temples, and hills.

References

Mountains of Fujian
Geography of East China
AAAAA-rated tourist attractions
Tourist attractions in Fujian
Tourist attractions in Ningde